The Holy Trinity Church of England Secondary School is a voluntary-aided comprehensive school in Crawley, West Sussex, England. The school has a roll of around 1300 students.

In December 2015, Paul Kennedy left as head teacher. In April 2015, Reverend Millwood was chosen as the new head.

Holy Trinity offers a range of GCSE, BTEC and A-Level courses. These are both vocational and part of the English Baccalaureate. Subjects range from English, to languages to Art. Holy Trinity also offers a WorkSkills course, which is designed as a GCSE subject to prepare students for future employment. There is a sixth form centre if students wish to continue their studies at an advanced level.

The school has a main site with new additions built on to it over time. These include a drama studio, Sports Hall and the 'Chichester Refectory' (the school's canteen).

In 2014, P. Sumner left as deputy head teacher after serving over 24 years at the school. In September 2014, R. Bradley was announced and became the school's new deputy head teacher.

Voluntary aided status 
The government provides the school with grant aid to cover 90% of the costs for external building maintenance and improvements. The governors are responsible for 10% of total costs. Each family represented in the school is invited to commit an annual donation.

The school is run by the Church of England and has been since its opening in 1969; some of the original buildings still exist.

History 
The Holy Trinity School is believed to have been the first purpose-built Church of England comprehensive school in the country. It provides a secondary education based on Christian belief.

Although the school started to take pupils in September 1967, it was not opened officially until 17 December 1969, when The Queen came to open the school.

School places 
Admission to the school is by application only and the pupils come from an area within a ten-mile radius of Crawley. The school takes children from some independent schools as well as local state primary schools. The Governors give priority to those who regularly attend a place of Christian worship but they also try to offer as many other places as possible to those who particularly want the school because of its Christian foundation, ethos and values.

Sport
The school has a history of success within its basketball programme, having won the nationwide basketball U15 National Schools Conference, alongside becoming national champions in the U19 and U15 categories in 2015. Furthermore the programme has produced a number of players who have gone on to represent both the national team and compete overseas in the US.

Records 
Holy Trinity has appeared in the Guinness Book of Records for holding the longest continuous basketball rally. Holy Trinity smashed the record of 60 hours and 3 seconds (set by Japan) and pushed the record to just over 72 hours. The record was set over 13–16 July 2007.

However the school no longer holds the record. It was raised to 81 hours in 2008 in Tenerife.

School productions 
The drama and music departments work with pupils to create productions every November, alternating between musicals and straight plays. Some productions are:
 Wendy and Peter Pan 2016
 Les Misérables 2015
 Beauty and the Beast 2014
 Oliver! 2013
 A Midsummer Night's Dream 2012
 Back to the 80s 2011
 Arabian Nights 2010
 Hairspray 2009
 Animal Farm 2008
 Seussical 2007

Model United Nations and Debating Society 
Until 2011 the school held an annual Model United Nations Conference around the beginning of July. The conference brought pupils from schools around the area together to debate and resolve problems together.

The Holy Trinity School also had a permanent Debating Society, meeting once a week to debate on key subjects concerning the school and the world. As well as hosting their own Model UN at the school, the Debating Society takes part in Model UN meetings at other schools. The Society (and the school in general) takes part in the National MACE Speaking competition each year; the competition is run by the English-Speaking Union. For three consecutive years the school has progressed beyond the first round of the competition.

Notes

External links 
 
 Holy Trinity Record (Newspaper)

Secondary Schools in Crawley
Buildings and structures in Crawley
Educational institutions established in 1969
Secondary schools in West Sussex
1969 establishments in England
Church of England secondary schools in the Diocese of Chichester
Voluntary aided schools in England